Gatauli is a village in Jind district  in the Indian state of Haryana. The village has four main mohala (panas): Dhanda, Ppadan, Shihmar, and Jodhan. Dhanda pana consists of Dhanda and Beniwal for Jaat people And pandit also in this pana. Shihmar pana consists of Jangra, Pandit Kaushik, and Jaat Shihmar people. Ppadan pana consists of mainly Jaat Malik, Pandit Bhardwaj, and Panchals. Parjapat and  Jodhan pana consist of Jaat Dhanda, Pandit, Nai, Rohila, and Parjapat people.

Geography 
Gatauli lies on Jind-Rohtak road (NH-71) 17.4  km from Jind City. Gatuali's nearby villages are Jai Jai Wanti, Ramkali, Shamlo Kalan, and Gosain Khera.

Sundar Branch irrigation canal flows between Gatauli and neighbouring village Shamlo Kalan. The village has 6 main ponds.

Economy 
The main occupation of the villagers is agriculture. Gatauli is a market hub for nearby villages. Many Indian Army soldiers and police personnel come from this village.

History 
Gatauli was previously named Rangi's Gatauli after Sh. Rangi Ram Malik, a popular, rich, and kind-hearted resident.
And His Son Named Dalip Singh Malik was also a kind hearted person.

Facilities 
The village offers 7 Chopals (community halls) and 6 Temples. The main temple is Samratgir Temple in Dhanda Pana and Shiv Temple in Padan Pana.

A Government Hospital is there.

A four-lane highway is under construction to connect Rohtak to Jind and will link the village to nearby cities.

Demographics 
As of 2011, the Indian census reported that the village had a population of 6,585, living in approximately 1,305 households. The gender breakdown in 54.26% male and 45.74% female, with 61% of the total population estimated to be employed. Local communities include Jaat, Pandit, Panchal, Jangra, Attkan,Bamniya and Chauhan.

Education 
Separate government schools educate girls and boys. 

 Shiv S.s.s. Gatauli
 G.d.s.s.s. Gatauli
 G.s.s.s Gatauli
 G.g.h.s. Gatauli

References

 Villages in Jind district